Aftabuddin or Aftab Uddin may refer to:
Aftabuddin (Aftab Uddin Mollah), Indian politician from Assam
Fakir Aftabuddin Khan (1862-1933), Bengali musician, composer and lyricist
Aftab Uddin Sarkar (active 1969-2014), Bangladeshi politicianb
Aftabuddin Alam (born 1993), Indian cricketer